Benefic Press was a Chicago-based publisher of educational books for children and young adults. The publishing division of Beckley-Cardy Company, it was a prolific publisher during the middle of the 20th century.

References

External link

Book publishing companies based in Illinois
Companies based in Chicago